Memory test may refer to:

 Mental status examination, human memory
 Memory test software, computer memory
 Neuropsychological test, a formal psychological test of human memory
 Announcer's test, a popular repetitive test and tongue-twister

See also
 
 
 Memory (disambiguation)
 Test (disambiguation)